The 2023 South American U-15 Championship will be the 10th edition of the South American U-15 Championship, the biennial international youth football championship organised by CONMEBOL for the men's under-15 national teams of South America. It will be held in Bolivia between 17 November and 3 December 2023.

The South American U-15 Championship returns after 4 years due to the COVID-19 pandemic forced CONMEBOL to cancel the tournament in 2021.

Brazil are the defending champions.

Teams
All ten CONMEBOL member national teams entered the tournament. Moreover, invited teams from UEFA are to be confirmed.

Venues
Bolivia was named as host country of the tournament during the CONMEBOL Council meeting on 30 September 2022. This will be the fourth time that Bolivia host the tournament, having previously done so in 2005, 2009 and 2013. Bolivia was also initially selected to host the previous edition in 2019, however, the tournament had to be rescheduled in Paraguay as Bolivia was unable to host it due to the 2019 Bolivian protests.

Santa Cruz was announced as host city with Estadio Ramón Tahuichi Aguilera as venue.

References

2034
International association football competitions hosted by Bolivia
Under-15 Football Championship
2023 in youth association football

South American Under-15 Football